Blairs Mills is an unincorporated community in Huntingdon County, Pennsylvania, United States. Blairs Mills has a post office with ZIP code 17213.

Local School District: Southern Huntingdon County School District

References

Unincorporated communities in Huntingdon County, Pennsylvania
Unincorporated communities in Pennsylvania